The  is one of nine active divisions of the Japan Ground Self-Defense Force. The division is subordinated to the Eastern Army and is headquartered at Camp Nerima in Nerima, Tokyo. Its responsibility is the defense of Tokyo and the Chiba, Ibaraki, Kanagawa, Saitama, Shizuoka and Yamanashi prefectures.

History
The division was raised on 18 January 1962 but dates back to the 1st District Corps (Tokyo) of the then National Police Reserve formed in 1950 and reformed in 1962 as an Infantry Division.

Organization 

Camp Nerima at Nerima, Tokyo 
 1st Division Headquarters Company
1st Infantry Regiment (Japanese) 
1st Logistic Support Regiment (Japanese)
 1st Maintenance Battalion
 2nd Maintenance Battalion
 Supply Unit
 Medical Unit
 Transport Unit
 1st NBC Weapon Defense Company
 1st Band
Camp Asaka at Asaka
 1st Engineer Battalion (Combat) (Japanese) 
 1st Reconnaissance Combat Battalion (Japanese), with Type 87 armored reconnaissance vehicles and Type 16 maneuver combat vehicles
1st Antiaircraft Artillery Battalion (Japanese), with Type 81 and Type 93 Surface-to-air missile systems at Camp Komakado in Gotemba
 32nd Infantry Regiment (Japanese), at Camp Ōmiya in Saitama
 34th Infantry Regiment (Japanese), at Camp Itazuma in Gotemba
 1st Artillery Battalion (Japanese), at Camp Kita Fuji in Oshino, with four batteries of FH-70 155mm towed howitzers
 1st Aviation Squadron, at Tachikawa Airfield, flying UH-1J and OH-6D helicopters

References

External links
 Homepage 1st  Division (Japanese)

Japan Ground Self-Defense Force Division
Military units and formations established in 1962